This Bibliography of Louis-Joseph Papineau, is an incomplete list of all things written by or published about Louis-Joseph Papineau in either French or English, original or translation.

In English

Biography 

 
 "A Chronology of the Life of Louis-Joseph Papineau," Manoir-Papineau National Historic site of Canada, Parks Canada
 Fernand Ouellet. "Louis-Joseph Papineau : A Divided Soul," in Canadian Historical Association, 11, Ottawa, 1960
 Thomas Storrow Brown, "Brief sketch of the life and times of the late Hon. Louis-Joseph Papineau," in New Dominion Monthly, 1872, January 1872, 20 pages
 Edmund Bailey O'Callaghan.  "A Biographical Sketch of the Hon. Louis Joseph Papineau, Speaker of the House of Assembly of Lower Canada," in Sentinel, Saratoga Springs, 1838

Studies 

 Peter Marshall. "George Bancroft on the Canadian Rebellions and the American Revolution," in The New England Quarterly, Vol. 63, No. 2 (Jun., 1990), pp. 302–308
 Lillian F. Gates. "A Canadian Rebel's Appeal to George Bancroft," dans The New England Quarterly, Vol. 41, No. 1 (March, 1968), pp. 96–104
 R. Howell. "The Political Testament of Papineau in Exile, 1837," in Canadian Historical Review, Vol. 38, No. 2 (sept. 1957): pp. 295–299

Parliamentary work
 An Act to declare persons of the Jewish Religion entitled to all of the rights and privileges of the other subjects of His Majesty in this Province, in the Journals of the Legislative Assembly of Lower Canada, 1832
 "The Ninety-Two Resolutions", in the Journals of the Legislative Assembly of Lower Canada, 1834

Other 

 "Family Tree of Louis-Joseph Papineau," in Manoir-Papineau National Historic site of Canada, Parks Canada
 Dorothy M. Chandler. "A Genealogy of the French-Canadian Family Lines of Papineau, Dontigny-Lucas, Gaudin (Godin), Gagné", in Wisconsin's French Connections, University of Wisconsin
 "Letter from Louis J.A. Papineau to Willis P. Popenoe, May 10, 1894", in Wisconsin's French Connections, University of Wisconsin
 Anthony Papineau. Papineau Family Home Page

In French

Written correspondence

Speech, addresses, public letters 

 
 
 
 Louis-Joseph Papineau. Histoire de l'insurrection du Canada, Montréal, Éditions Leméac, 1968, 104 p.
 Fernand Ouellet. "Papineau; textes choisis", in Cahiers de l'institut d’histoire, 1, Québec, 1964
 Louis-Joseph Papineau. Un testament politique, volume 150, edition of the La Bibliothèque électronique du Québec, 2003 (PDF)
 "Discours de Louis-Joseph Papineau", in L'Encyclopédie de l'Agora

Biographies, studies 

 Denis Aubert. "Louis-Joseph PAPINEAU (1786-1871) une esquisse biographique", in the Web site Les Projets DA-GO, June 24, 2006
 Nathalie Dubois. "L'exil de Louis-Joseph Papineau (1837-1845)", in the Web site Les Patriotes de 1837@1838, May 19, 2001
 Marguerite Paulin (2000). Louis-Joseph Papineau, Le grand tribun, le pacifiste, Éditions XYZ, Montréal, 
 Marc Chevrier. "Le provincialisme, ou l'indolence politique", dans Liberté, volume 40, no. 6, December 1998, p. 4-23
 Michel Bédard (1993) Louis-Joseph Papineau : synthèse préliminaire des connaissances sur l'homme politique et le seigneur, Québec, Parcs Canada 359 p.
 Fernand Ippersiel (1990). Les cousins ennemis : Louis-Joseph Papineau et Jean-Jacques Lartigue, Montréal, Guérin littérature
 Ruth L. White (1983). Louis-Joseph Papineau et Lamennais. le chef des Patriotes Canadiens à Paris, 1839-1845. avec correspondence et documents inédits., Montréal, Hurtubise HMH 
 Robert Rumilly (1977). Papineau et son temps, Fides, 2 volumes
 Fernand Ouellet. "Papineau et la rivalité Québec-Montréal (1820–1840)", in Revue d'histoire de l'Amérique française, XIII, 1959, pp. 311–327
 Robert Rumilly (1944). Papineau, Montréal, B. Valiquette 281 p.
 Ève Circé-Côté (1924). Papineau, son influence sur la pensée canadienne : essai de psychologie historique, Montréal, R.A. Regnault
 Lionel Groulx. "Louis-Joseph Papineau, l'homme politique", in Notre maître, le passé, 1924, pp. 189–211
 Alfred Duclos De Celles (1905). Papineau, 1786–1871, Montréal, Librairie Beauchemin
 Laurent-Olivier David (1896). Les deux Papineau, Montréal, Eusèbe Sénécal
 Laurent-Olivier David (1872). L'Honorable Louis-Joseph Papineau, Montréal, Typographie Geo. E. Desbarats (PDF edited by La Bibliothèque électronique du Québec)
 "Louis-Joseph Papineau" in the Web site of the Québec National Assembly
 "Dossier Louis-Joseph Papineau", in L'Encyclopédie de l'Agora

Tribute 

 Louis Fréchette. "Papineau", in Pêle-mêle: fantaisies et souvenirs poétiques, Montréal, Compagnie d'impression et de publication Lovell, 1877, p. 15-22  (poem)
 Louis Fréchette. Papineau, edition of  La Bibliothèque électronique du Québec (play)

Others 

 François Labonté (2004). Alias Anthony St. John. Les patriotes Canadiens aux États-Unis, décembre 1837 - mai 1838, Sainte-Foy, Presses de l'Université Laval 
 Yvan Lamonde and Claude Larin (1998). "Bibliographie chronologique des études sur Louis-Joseph Papineau", in Louis-Joseph Papineau. Un demi-siècle de combats. Interventions publiques, Éditions Fides, pages 656-662 (covers all works published between 1871 and 1997)
 Louis-Joseph Papineau - Le demi-dieu, documentary of the NFB directed by Louis-Georges Carrier, scenario by Guy Dufresne, 1961, 26 min 08
 Jean-Normand Pickering-LeBlanc (Johnny-Normand Pickering alias)  «Le Mémorial Papineau». Montréal, Éditions du Fleuve, 1989. 184 p. (23 cm). Illustrations et tableaux.

Notes 

Papineau